Nicholas Hoyt (also Nicholas Hayts or Nicholas Hoit) (May 7, 1620 – ?) was a deputy of the General Assembly of the Colony of Connecticut from Norwalk in the session of October 1673.

He was the son of Simon Haite and Deborah Stowers. He arrived in America on September 6, 1628, with his father and brother, Walter Hoyt, at the age of eight.

By 1630, the family is recorded as being settled in Dorcester, Massachusetts., but later relocated to Scituate, and by 1640, to Windsor, Connecticut.

References 

1620 births
Year of death missing
American Puritans
Deputies of the Connecticut General Assembly (1662–1698)
English emigrants
Politicians from Norwalk, Connecticut
People from Taunton Deane (district)